A Productive Cough is the fifth studio album by New Jersey punk rock band Titus Andronicus, released on March 2, 2018, through Merge Records. The band's frontman, Patrick Stickles, indicated that the album is a departure from their earlier work insofar as it contains no "punk bangers" and offers "a mellower, more ballad-oriented approach" while also capturing the looseness of the band's live performances.

Track listing

Charts

References

2018 albums
Titus Andronicus (band) albums
Merge Records albums